The French 41st Army Corps was a French military unit during the second world war
041